Fox Reality Channel was an American pay television channel. It was launched on May 24, 2005, and was owned by the Fox Entertainment Group. It featured many shows that were originally on the Fox network (or produced by Fox). The channel also featured reality shows syndicated from other networks (such as ABC, CBS, NBC, The CW and MyNetworkTV), as well as many international shows from the United Kingdom, Australia, and New Zealand.

Shutdown and replacement
In October 2009, it was announced that Fox Reality Channel would be discontinued on most providers on March 29, 2010, and re-branded as an American version of Nat Geo Wild.

On that date, the channel's old website was taken down and redirected to its archived programming on now Disney-owned Hulu, as well as Nat Geo Wild's new site. Nat Geo Wild was launched on Dish Network on April 19, 2010. DirecTV removed Fox Reality and added Nat Geo Wild on June 30, 2010, with an automated loop of Fox Reality programming remaining until those respective launch dates on those satellite providers.

Programming

Original programming
The Academy, provides a behind-the-scenes look at police recruits of the Los Angeles Sheriff's Academy as they go through an 18-week training course to become deputies of the County Sheriff's Department. The program premiered in May 2007, and is shared with sister broadcast network MyNetworkTV.
American Idol Extra, The official aftershow of the immensely popular American Idol.  This show includes behind-the-scenes footage and interviews with contestants who have been eliminated.
Battle of the Bods is a reality show in which five girls rank themselves in order of attractiveness and try to match the rankings of a panel of male judges. Hosted by Olivia Lee, the program premiered January 19, 2008.
Busted and Disgusted is an original series bringing viewers clips of the most outrageous behavior caught on camera. The show premiered on April 1, 2009.
Camp Reality, Burton Roberts (Survivor: Pearl Islands) organizes a trip into the California woods for a number of his former reality-show friends for a series of fun contests, including water-orb races and a milk chugging contest. Friends who participated in this event included Toni Ferrari (Paradise Hotel), Rebecca Cardon (The Amazing Race 6 and Work Out), Brennan Swain (co-winner of The Amazing Race 1), Coral Smith (The Real World and several MTV Challenges), Nikki McKibbin (American Idol), Michelle Deighton (America's Next Top Model, Cycle 4), and Jon "Jonny Fairplay" Dalton.
Corkscrewed, follows American Idol producers Ken Warwick and Nigel Lythgoe as they purchase a vineyard in Paso Robles, California, and encounter the vagaries of the wine business.  The program premiered on November 30, 2006.
Gimme My Reality Show! has a group of seven former celebrities compete to win their own reality show.
Househusbands of Hollywood, follows the lives of five men who manage households in families in which their wives earn the majority of the household income. The 10-episode series premiered on Saturday, August 15, 2009.
Long Way Down, profiles actor Ewan McGregor as he bikes through 18 countries, riding from John o' Groats in Scotland to Cape Town in South Africa.
Rob and Amber: Against the Odds, follows the lives of reality couple Rob Mariano and Amber Mariano as Rob tries to become a professional poker player.
My Bare Lady, gives adult film stars the opportunity to try out different careers. The program premiered on December 7, 2006.
Paradise Hotel 2, follows a group of single men and women who live together for a period in an exclusive resort.  The program premiered February 4, 2008 and was shared by MyNetworkTV.
Seducing Cindy, follows Cindy Margolis, once the most downloaded woman on the Internet, as she searches for a new love. The program premiered on January 30, 2010, at 9:00PM Eastern/8:00PM Central.
Solitary, turns the concept of solitary confinement into a game show.  The program, which features an unseen host presiding over "treatments", or challenges, premiered on June 5, 2006.
The Search for the Next Elvira, 13 contestants vie for the chance to become Elvira's newest 'handmaiden of the dark' in a Fox Reality Channel original series. The program premiered on October 13, 2007.
Sex Decoy: Love Stings, set inside the private life and professional world of Sandra Hope and "Mate Check Private Investigations". Each episode chronicles specific cases in which a spouse or significant other hires Sandra and her team of decoys to "tempt" their potentially wayward lover and expose infidelity. The show also follows the ups and downs of Sandra's dysfunctional family, including her daughters and her fiance Thomas Scharrer, who work for her as decoys. The program premiered on May 23, 2009. 
Smile...You're Under Arrest!, uses elaborate sting set-ups to lure wanted-criminals out of hiding. Improvisational actors assist with the scenarios before police officers arrest the criminal. The program premiered on December 27, 2008.

Acquired programming sample 

Amazing Adventures of a Nobody
The Amazing Race
American Idol
Arrest & Trial
Average Joe
Beauty and the Geek
The Biggest Loser
Blind Date
Boot Camp
Breaking the Magician's Code: Magic's Biggest Secrets Finally Revealed
Celebrity Boxing
Celebrity Mole
Divorce Court
Don't Forget the Lyrics!
EX-treme Dating
For Love or Money
Ghosts Caught on Tape: Fact Or Fiction
Hell's Kitchen
Judge Alex
Kitchen Nightmares

LAPD: Life On the Beat
Last Comic Standing
Looking for Love: Bachelorettes in Alaska
Mad Mad House
Maximum Exposure
The Mole
My Big Fat Obnoxious Fiance
Outback Jack
Punk’d
Real Stories of the Highway Patrol
Real TV
The Restaurant
Seducing Cindy
Sexy Cam
So You Think You Can Dance
Street Patrol
The Swan
Train Wrecks
Who Wants to Marry My Dad?

See also 
 Fox Reality Channel Reality Awards
 MyNetworkTV - sister network with a once mostly-reality format.

References

Defunct television networks in the United States
Television channels and stations established in 2005
Television channels and stations disestablished in 2010
2005 establishments in the United States
2010 disestablishments in the United States